Blues Brothers 2000 is a 1998 American musical comedy film directed by John Landis from a screenplay written by Landis and Dan Aykroyd, both of whom were also producers. The film, starring Aykroyd and John Goodman, is a sequel to the 1980 film The Blues Brothers. It also includes cameo appearances by various musicians.

Blues Brothers 2000 was released on February 6, 1998, to mixed-to-negative reviews from critics, and grossed $32.1 million on a budget of $30 million. Blues Brothers 2000 is dedicated to John Belushi, Cab Calloway and John Candy, cast members from the original film who had died prior to the sequel's production, in addition to Junior Wells, who died one month before it was released.

Plot
Elwood Blues is released from prison after serving eighteen years for the events of the previous film and is informed that his brother, "Joliet" Jake Blues has died. He is picked up by Matara, a friend who works for his former drummer Willie Hall who wants to help him get back on his feet.

Before meeting up with Willie, Elwood asks to be dropped off to see Mother Mary Stigmata who is now working at a hospital after the orphanage was closed. She informs him that Curtis has also died but fathered an illegitimate son, Cabel Chamberlain, who is an Illinois State Police commander, and introduces him to an orphan, Buster, to suggest mentoring him.

Against Stigmata’s advice, Elwood tracks down Cabel at his police headquarters to inform him of his real father and asks him to join The Blues Brothers Band, which he plans on reforming. Cabel, upset by the news and offended by the suggestion to join him after seeing Elwood's and Jake's criminal histories, throws him out of the building, where Buster steals his wallet; it contains enough money for Elwood to purchase a new Bluesmobile.

Elwood and Buster begin tracking down members of the former band to recruit them from their current jobs. Willie runs a strip club and joins after it is burned down by the Russian mafia because Elwood enlisted the help of Willie’s barman "Mighty" Mack McTeer to try and convince them to leave the club alone. Another member, Matt "Guitar" Murphy, joins again at the advice of his wife, with whom he now runs a Mercedes-Benz dealership. Three members work at a radio station and quickly agree to join, and finally, Murphy Dunne joins after his boss at a call center gives him permission.

The newly-reformed band uses their old agent to book them a show. On the way to the show, they are followed by Cabel and the Illinois state police, who are now looking for Elwood for stealing Cabel’s wallet earlier, and believing that he has kidnapped Buster. While avoiding the police, Elwood interrupts a militia group meeting, unintentionally destroying their boat full of explosives they planned to use.

The band arrives at the show to find they have been mistakenly booked as a Bluegrass band, but perform anyway. Afterwards, they evade capture by the police, but they catch up with them at a tent revival where Reverend Cleophus James is preaching. Before Cabel can arrest them, he has an epiphany brought on by Reverend Cleophus that he should join the band instead of being a police officer. The band evades capture once more, now with Cabel joining them, who the police believe is brainwashed.

The band continues on to their next booking, an audition for a Battle of the Bands put on by Queen Mousette who Mack informs is allegedly a 130-year-old voodoo witch. Queen Mousette requests the band play something Caribbean; when Elwood explains they don’t play Caribbean music, she casts a spell on them to play anyway. Mousette accepts the band into the battle; however Elwood, Mack, and Cabel are turned into statues.

At the show, Queen Mousette undoes the spell to allow the Blues Brothers to play against the Louisiana Gator Boys, a supergroup of blues musicians who win the battle. After the battle, the show is interrupted by the arrival of the Russian mafia and the militia group from earlier; they are turned into rats by Queen Mousette. The Illinois state police arrive, but stand down after Cabel informs them that he is all right. Elwood suggests that the two bands jam together on stage, and uses the performance as cover when Mother Mary Stigmata arrives to say goodbye to Cabel and Mack and escape with Buster, with the police giving chase.

Cast and characters

Bands and musical guests

The Blues Brothers Band

 Dan Aykroyd as Elwood J. Blues – harmonica and vocals
 John Goodman as "Mighty" Mack McTeer – lead vocals
 Joe Morton as Commander Cabel Chamberlain/Cab Blues – vocals
 J. Evan Bonifant as Buster "Scribbles" Blues – vocals and harmonica (harmonica recorded by John Popper)
 Steve Cropper as Steve "the Colonel" Cropper – rhythm guitar and vocals
 Donald "Duck" Dunn as Donald "Duck" Dunn – bass guitar
 Murphy Dunne as Murphy "Murph" Dunne – keyboards 
 Willie Hall as Willie "Too Big" Hall – drums and percussion
 Tom Malone as Tom "Bones" Malone – trombone, tenor saxophone and vocals
 Lou Marini as "Blue Lou" Marini – alto saxophone and tenor saxophone and vocals
 Matt Murphy as Matt "Guitar" Murphy – lead guitar
 Alan Rubin as Alan "Mr. Fabulous" Rubin – trumpet, percussion and vocals

Musical guests
 Erykah Badu as Queen Moussette
 Blues Traveler as themselves  
 Lonnie Brooks as himself 
 Eddie Floyd as Ed 
 Aretha Franklin as Mrs. Murphy 
 James Brown as Reverend Cleophus James 
 Jonny Lang as janitor 
 Sam Moore as Reverend Morris 
 Wilson Pickett as Mr. Pickett 
 Junior Wells as himself

The Louisiana Gator Boys
The Louisiana Gator Boys is a blues supergroup created for the film. They face The Blues Brothers in a Battle of the Bands. The band is composed of:
 Jeff "Skunk" Baxter – guitar
 Gary U.S. Bonds – vocals
 Eric Clapton – vocals and guitar
 Clarence Clemons – vocals, tenor saxophone and tambourine
 Jack DeJohnette – drums
 Bo Diddley – vocals and guitar
 Jon Faddis – trumpet
 Isaac Hayes – vocals
 Dr. John – vocals and piano
 B.B. King as Malvern Gasperone – vocals and guitar
 Tommy "Pipes" McDonnell – vocals 
 Charlie Musselwhite – vocals and harmonica
 Billy Preston – vocals and synthesizer
 Lou Rawls – vocals
 Joshua Redman – tenor saxophone
 Paul Shaffer as Marco/Himself – keyboards
 Koko Taylor – vocals
 Travis Tritt – vocals and guitar
 Jimmie Vaughan – vocals and guitar
 Grover Washington Jr. – baritone saxophone
 Willie Weeks – bass guitar
 Steve Winwood – vocals and organ

Kathleen Freeman, Frank Oz, Steve Lawrence and Jeff Morris appeared in cameos, all reprising their roles from The Blues Brothers film. Nia Peeples portrays a state police officer, Darrell Hammond a militia member, John Lyons a Russian thug, and Paul Shaffer as Queen Moussette's majordomo. The film is dedicated to John Belushi, Cab Calloway, and John Candy, cast members from the original film who had died prior to the sequel's production.

Production
Blues Brothers 2000 made it into the Guinness Book of Records for the biggest car pile-up, a record previously held by the original film. 63 cars were used in the scene after Elwood says to the band, "Don't look back." Inevitably, everyone looks back and sees the massive pile-up. Portions of this scene were filmed in Niagara Falls, Ontario.

The original film had held the record for the most cars destroyed during production of a motion picture with 103. Blues Brothers 2000 surpassed this total with 104, a mark that would stand until 112 cars were destroyed during the filming of G.I. Joe: The Rise of Cobra in 2009.

Casting

The film was originally intended to include Brother Zee Blues (Jim Belushi, brother of John Belushi). But due to an already existing television deal (Belushi had been cast in the ABC drama Total Security), Belushi was unable to appear and the script was altered to include Cab Blues (Joe Morton). This character was named Cabel as an homage to Cab Calloway, who died four years prior to the film's release. (His character Curtis was revealed to have died in the film along with Jake.)

The Blues Brothers' original keyboardist, Paul Shaffer, had been committed to Gilda Radner's one-woman show on Broadway and was therefore unable to appear in the first film. He was replaced by actor-musician Murphy Dunne. Shaffer does appear in Blues Brothers 2000, taking a week off from Late Show with David Letterman to film his role as Queen Moussette's majordomo and emcee of the Battle of the Bands (Warren Zevon took his place that week on Letterman's show). Shaffer shaved his head for the role, a change in appearance he chose to retain permanently.

During the "Funky Nassau" number, Shaffer in his character of "Marco," asks to cut in on keyboards, which Murph allows. This marks the first time on-screen that the Blues Brothers Band played with their original keyboardist.

Several cast members from the first film reprised their characters, including Frank Oz, Jeff Morris, Steve Lawrence, Kathleen Freeman, Aretha Franklin, and James Brown.

Release
Blues Brothers 2000 was screened out of competition at the 1998 Cannes Film Festival.

Box office
The film grossed a little over $14 million in box office sales in North America.

Critical reception
The film received mixed reviews, averaging a 46% positive rating at Rotten Tomatoes based on 48 reviews, and a critical consensus that reads "Braving onward without the late John Belushi, Blues Brothers 2000 gets the band back together with a spirited soundtrack, but a mission that's far less divine". It earned a D score from Entertainment Weekly. Roger Ebert gave the film 2 stars, saying, "The film is lame comedy surrounded by high-energy blues (and some pop, rock and country music)."

Audiences polled by CinemaScore gave the film an average grade of "B-" on an A+ to F scale.

Video game

A Blues Brothers 2000 video game was released for the Nintendo 64 on November 17, 2000, two years after the film's release. The plot of the game involves Elwood as the main character going through different chapters and levels while trying to save the kidnapped members of the band one by one. Like the film on which it based and the video game based on the first film, it was poorly received.

Soundtrack

References

External links

 
 
 
 

The Blues Brothers
Blues films
1998 films
1990s English-language films
1990s buddy comedy films
1990s musical comedy films
1990s road movies
1990s musical films
American action comedy films
American buddy comedy films
American musical comedy films
American road movies
American sequel films
Films about Catholic nuns
Films about music and musicians
Films directed by John Landis
Films set in Chicago
Films set in Louisiana
Films shot in Chicago
Films shot in Kingston, Ontario
Saturday Night Live films
Films with screenplays by Dan Aykroyd
Films with screenplays by John Landis
Universal Pictures films
Films produced by John Landis
1998 action comedy films
1990s American films